Mount MacFarlane is a  mountain summit located in the Cascade Mountains of southwestern British Columbia, Canada. Precipitation runoff from the peak drains into Slesse Creek and Pierce Creek, both tributaries of the Chilliwack River. The mountain was named to honor Royal Canadian Air Force First Lieutenant Ronald E. MacFarlane, from nearby Chilliwack, who was killed in action on December 16, 1943, at age 21. The name was officially adopted on April 7, 1955, by the Geographical Names Board of Canada.

Geology

Mount MacFarlane is related to the Chilliwack batholith, which intruded the region 26 to 29 million years ago after the major orogenic episodes in the region. This is part of the Pemberton Volcanic Belt, an eroded volcanic belt that formed as a result of subduction of the Farallon Plate starting 29 million years ago.

During the Pleistocene period dating back over two million years ago, glaciation advancing and retreating repeatedly scoured the landscape leaving deposits of rock debris. The "U"-shaped cross section of the river valleys are a result of recent glaciation. Uplift and faulting in combination with glaciation have been the dominant processes which have created the tall peaks and deep valleys of the North Cascades area.

The North Cascades features some of the most rugged topography in the Cascade Range with craggy peaks and ridges, deep glacial valleys, and granite spires. Geological events occurring many years ago created the diverse topography and drastic elevation changes over the Cascade Range leading to various climate differences which lead to vegetation variety defining the ecoregions in this area.

Climate

Based on the Köppen climate classification, Mount MacFarlane is located in the marine west coast climate zone of western North America. Most weather fronts originate in the Pacific Ocean, and travel east toward the Cascade Range where they are forced upward by the range (Orographic lift), causing them to drop their moisture in the form of rain or snowfall. As a result, the Cascade Mountains experience high precipitation, especially during the winter months in the form of snowfall. Temperatures can drop below −20 °C with wind chill factors below −30 °C. The months July through September offer the most favorable weather for climbing MacFarlane.

Climbing Routes
Established climbing routes on Mount McGuire:

 Northeast Ridge -  - Approach via Pierce Lake Trail

See also

 Geography of the North Cascades
 Geology of British Columbia

References

External links
 Weather: Mount MacFarlane
 Hiking route description: Outdoor Vancouver
 Climbing Mt. MacFarlane: YouTube
 View from the summit: YouTube

Two-thousanders of British Columbia
Canadian Cascades
Pemberton Volcanic Belt
Cascade Range
North Cascades
Yale Division Yale Land District